Song About the Merchant Kalashnikov (translit. Pesn pro kuptsa Kalashnikova) is a 1909 Russian silent film directed by Vasily Goncharov. The film is believed to be lost.

Plot
The film was loosely based on the eponymous poem by Mikhail Lermontov and consisted of four scenes: the feast at the court of Ivan the Terrible, the assault of Kalashnikov's wife by oprichnik Kiribeevich, the argument between Kalashnikov and Kiribeevich, and the fistfight between the protagonists.

Production
Song About the Merchant Kalashnikov was filmed in 1908 with actors from the troupe of Vvedensky Narodny Dom. Pyotr Chardynin, who later become one of the leading directors of the Russian Empire, debuted in the film as an actor.

Cast
Pyotr Chardynin as Merchant Kalashnikov
Aleksandra Goncharova as Kalashnikov's wife	
Andrey Gromov as Oprichnik Kiribeevich	
Ivan Potyomkin as Ivan the Terrible
Antonina Pozharskaya

References

External links

1909 films
Films of the Russian Empire
Russian black-and-white films
Russian silent short films
Films directed by Vasily Goncharov
Cultural depictions of Ivan the Terrible
Mikhail Lermontov
Lost Russian films
1909 short films
1909 lost films